The 1972/73 NTFL season was the 52nd season of the Northern Territory Football League (NTFL).

Darwin have won there 19th premiership title while defeating St Marys in the grand final by 30 points.

Grand Final

References

Northern Territory Football League seasons
NTFL